Spiering is a surname and may refer to:

 Henry Spiering (1831–1908), German-American editor and politician
 Louis C. Spiering (1874—1912), American architect; brother of Theodore Spiering
 Rainer Spiering (born 1956), German politician
 Ray and Louise Spiering, plaintiffs in a court case over silent birth
 Theodore Spiering (1871–1925), American violinist, conductor and teacher; brother of Louis C. Spiering

See also
 Stijn Spierings (born 1996), Dutch footballer 
 Spierings Kranen, Dutch manufacturer of cranes

English-language surnames
German-language surnames
Dutch-language surnames

de:Spiering